Tajada "slices" is a dish of fried plantains that are sliced long. It is a typical food of Caribbean countries as well as Nicaragua, Colombia, Honduras, Panama, and Venezuela. It is sometimes served with grated cheese.

See also
Aborrajado 
Chifle 
Fried plantain 
Mofongo 
Patacón
Tostones

References

Caribbean cuisine
Plantain dishes
Nicaraguan cuisine
Colombian cuisine
Honduran cuisine
Panamanian cuisine
Venezuelan cuisine